Patrick Mihai Petre (born 9 May 1997) is a Romanian professional footballer who plays as a winger for Liga III club Ceahlăul Piatra Neamț.

Club career

Petre joined Dinamo București at the age of 6 and gradually progressed through the various youth teams. On October 31, 2014, at the age of seventeen, he made his Liga I debut in a 3-0 loss to rivals Steaua București.

In the summer of 2017, after falling down the pecking order at Dinamo, Petre went on a season-long loan to newly promoted club Sepsi OSK. In July 2018, Petre was transferred to another Liga I club, the highly aspiring Politehnica Iași, where he was requested by his former Dinamo manager, Flavius Stoican.

Personal life
Patrick Petre is the son of former Romanian international and Dinamo București legend, Florentin Petre.

Honours
Minaur Baia Mare
Liga III: 2021–22

References

External links
 
Patrick Petre at Romaniansoccer

1997 births
Footballers from Bucharest
Living people
Romanian footballers
Association football midfielders
Liga I players
FC Dinamo București players
Sepsi OSK Sfântu Gheorghe players
FC Politehnica Iași (2010) players
Liga II players
FCV Farul Constanța players
AFC Dacia Unirea Brăila players
Liga III players
CS Minaur Baia Mare (football) players
CSM Ceahlăul Piatra Neamț players